Logan Delaurier-Chaubet (born 22 April 2002) is a French professional footballer who plays as an attacking midfielder for  club Bordeaux.

Club career 

On 4 June 2020, Delaurier-Chaubet signed his first professional contract with Bordeaux, a three-year deal. After having played in three different seasons with the club's reserve side, he joined the first team in 2022, making his professional debut on 31 July 2022 as a starter in a 0–0 Ligue 2 draw against Valenciennes. On 4 August, Delaurier-Chaubet signed a contract extension, keeping him at Bordeaux until June 2026. On 13 August, he scored his first professional goal in a 1–0 win over Chamois Niortais.

International career 

Delaurier-Chaubet was a France youth international. He made four appearances and scored one goal for the France U16s in 2018, and made one appearance for the France U18s in 2020.

References

External links 
 
 
 

2002 births
Living people
Sportspeople from Ariège (department)
French footballers
Association football midfielders
Balma SC players
FC Girondins de Bordeaux players
Championnat National 3 players
Ligue 2 players
France youth international footballers